The 2023 Laver Cup will be the sixth edition of the Laver Cup, a men's tennis tournament between teams from Europe and the rest of the world. It will be held on an indoor hard court at the Rogers Arena in Vancouver, Canada from 22 until 24 September.

Team World will attempt to defend their title after winning the Laver Cup for the first time last year.

Player selection
On 2 February 2023, Félix Auger-Aliassime was the first player to confirm his participation for Team World.

Participants

References

External links

2023
2023 ATP Tour
September 2023 sports events in Canada
Sports competitions in Vancouver
Tennis tournaments in Canada